Robert Dickinson (20 May 1901 – 5 March 1981) was a British athlete. He competed in the men's high jump at the 1924 Summer Olympics.

References

External links
 

1901 births
1981 deaths
Athletes (track and field) at the 1924 Summer Olympics
British male high jumpers
Olympic athletes of Great Britain
Place of birth missing